Litsea calicaris, the mangeao, is an evergreen tree endemic to the North Island of New Zealand, occurring in lowland forest from near North Cape south to about 38°S. It belongs to the Laurel family, Lauraceae.

Description

Mangeao is the only New Zealand representative of the genus Litsea which consists of 200–400 species of evergreen or deciduous trees or shrubs in tropical and subtropical Asia, Australia, North America and South America. There are more than 70 species in China, mostly in warm regions in the south and southwest. Mangeao is commonest in the southern part of its range, especially in the hill country between Te Kuiti and the west coast, and in the Kaimai Ranges between Katikati and Rotorua. Thriving best on limestone-derived soils or heavy clays, mangeao requires good drainage and has low tolerance of drought conditions. Young trees are very frost tender.

Uses

Mangeao produces high-quality timber with excellent strength and flexibility. The wood is white, firm, and strong, combining toughness with elasticity and light weight. In the 19th century it was used for many purposes including the making of barrels and wheels, and for boat frames, railway carriages and sporting goods. It also produces a high quality sliced veneer. Current uses are in the making of violins and for the ribs of kayaks. It was also used for the 9th floor of the Beehive building (the executive wing of the Parliament of New Zealand). The Māori are said to have used it for its medicinal properties.

Threats
Apart from the threat posed by forest clearance, mangeao suffers badly from browsing by possums.

References

Allan, H.H. 1961: Flora of New Zealand, Volume I, Government Printer, Wellington.
Poole, A. L. & N. M. Adams 1994: Trees and shrubs of New Zealand. Government Printer, Wellington.

Trees of New Zealand
calicaris